Elżbieta Hałas (1954–present) is a Polish sociologist and a professor at the University of Warsaw. She specializes in the sociology of culture.

She is the director of the Cultural Department in the University of Warsaw's Institute of Sociology. Previously (1981-2003) she lectured at the John Paul II Catholic University of Lublin, where she received her doctorate in 1986.

She is a member of a number of professional organizations, and has held a number of positions within them. She has edited a number of sociology journals. She is the author of a number of academic articles and books.

Works
 Społeczny kontekst znaczeń w teorii symbolicznego interakcjonizmu, Lublin (1987), Redakcja Wydawnictw Katolickiego Uniwersytetu Lubelskiego
 Znaczenia i wartości społeczne. O socjologii Floriana Znanieckiego, Lublin (1991), Redakcja Wydawnictw Katolickiego Uniwersytetu Lubelskiego
 Konwersja. Perspektywa socjologiczna, Lublin (1992) Norbertinum, wydanie nowe (2007)
 Obywatelska socjologia szkoły chicagowskiej, Lublin (1994), Redakcja Wydawnictw Katolickiego Uniwersytetu Lubelskiego
 Symbole w interakcji, Warszawa (2001), Oficyna Naukowa
 Interakcjonizm symboliczny. Społeczny kontekst znaczeń Wydanie nowe, Warszawa (2006), Wydawnictwo Naukowe PWN
 Symbole i społeczeństwo. Szkice z socjologii interpretacyjnej, Warszawa (2007), Wydawnictwa Uniwersytetu Warszawskiego
 Towards the World Culture Society. Florian Znaniecki's Culturalism, Frankfurt Am Main (2010), Peter Lang Internationaler Verlag der Wissenschaften

External links
Homepage

1954 births
Polish sociologists
Polish women sociologists
Academic staff of the University of Warsaw
Living people
Polish women academics